Gregor Zore is a Slovenian football player.

External links
 Stats at PrvaLiga.

Slovenian footballers
NK Ljubljana players
NK Nafta Lendava players
1978 births
Living people
NK Krka players
Association football midfielders